This is a list of Canadian films released in 2020:

See also
 2020 in Canada
 2020 in Canadian television

References

External links
Feature Films Released In 2020 With Country of Origin Canada at IMDb

2020

Canada